Richard Ellis may refer to:

Academics
 Richard Ellis (astronomer) (born 1950), Caltech professor and former director of Palomar Observatory
 Richard Ellis (biologist) (born 1938), American marine biologist, author, and illustrator 
 Richard Ellis (librarian) (1865–1928), Welsh librarian and scholar
 Richard S. Ellis (1947–2018), American mathematician
 Richard Ellis (paediatrician) (1902–1966), British paediatrician
 Richard Keith Ellis (born 1949), British theoretical physicist

Politicians
Richard Ellis (Texas politician) (1781–1846), Texas legislator
Richard Ellis (MP), in 1417 and 1421, MP for Great Yarmouth
Richard Ellis (Massachusetts politician), 17th century representative to the Great and General Court
Richard Ellis (Dedham), 19th century representative to the Great and General Court

Other people
Richard Ellis (English cricketer) (born 1960), former English cricketer
Richard Ellis (New Zealand cricketer) (born 1945), New Zealand cricketer
Richard Ellis (journalist), British former editor of the Sunday Telegraph
Richard H. Ellis (1919–1989), U.S. Air Force general and former Strategic Air Command commander
Richard Ellis (American photographer) (born 1960), news photographer and founder of the photo agency Newsmakers
Richard Ellis (Maltese photographer) (1842–1924), British-Maltese photographer

Other uses
Richard Ellis International Limited, now part of CBRE Group, real estate company

See also 
Richard Ellys
Rick Ellis (disambiguation)
Dick Ellis (1895–1975), British intelligence officer
Rick Elice (born 1956), writer

Ellis, Richard